Volodymyr Zhuk (born 30 May 1986) is a Ukrainian football goalkeeper who has played in the Ukrainian Premier League.

Career
Born in Zaporizhzhia, Zhuk played youth football for FC Torpedo Zaporizhzhia and FC Metalurh Zaporizhzhia. He made his Premier League debut with Metalurh Zaporizhzhia against FC Vorskla Poltava on 19 October 2008. He would make a total of 15 Premier League appearances for Metalurh Zaporizhzhia before signing with Ukrainian First League side FC Olimpik Donetsk in 2013.

References

External links
Statistics at FFU website

1986 births
Living people
Ukrainian footballers
Association football goalkeepers
Footballers from Zaporizhzhia